NDCS may refer to:
 National Deaf Children's Society
 National Dental Centre Singapore
 Nebraska Department of Correctional Services